The Montenegro Davis Cup team represents Montenegro in Davis Cup tennis competition and are governed by the Tennis Federation of Montenegro.

Montenegro currently compete in Europe Zone Group III.

Montenegro made its debut in Davis Cup in 2007 in the Europe/Africa Zone of Group IV. In competition with Andorra, Armenia, Botswana and Rwanda, Montenegro finished first with all four victories, losing only one set in twelve matches played.

In 2008, Montenegro competed in the Europe/Africa Zone of Group III. With four victories and one defeat at the hands of host Bulgaria, Montenegro was second in Venue 1 and was promoted to Europe/Africa Zone of Group II.

In 2009, Montenegro lost a first round tie to Monaco 5–0 at Monte Carlo Country Club, Roquebrune Cap Martin, and had to play a relegation play-off against Denmark. The tie came to the decisive match, which Montenegro lost in straight sets. With the final score 2–3, Montenegro lost its second tie in the second group, which led to relegation back to Europe Zone Group III. In 2013, Montenegro played only one draw against San Marino; after two matches, the last game was not played due to heavy rains.

Current team (2022) 

 Rrezart Cungu
 Matija Samardzić
 Danilo Raicević
 Petar Jovanović
 Aleksa Krivokapić

History
Montenegro competed in its first Davis Cup in 2007.  Montenegro previously competed as part of Serbia and Montenegro and as part of Yugoslavia.

Matches 
Full list of Montenegrin Davis Cup team matches (since independence):

Note: Montenegro scores first

Statistics
''Last updated: Montenegro - Malta; 7 April 2018

Record
Total: 29–14–1 (65.9%)

Head-to-head record (2007–)

Record against continents

Record by decade
2007–2009: 8–3 (72.7%) 
2010–2019: 21–11–1 (63.6%)

See also
Davis Cup
Tennis Federation of Montenegro
Montenegro Fed Cup team

References

External links

Davis Cup teams
Davis Cup
Davis Cup